Old First Methodist Episcopal Church South is a historic church at 200 N. Fulton in Wharton, Texas.

It was built in 1927 and added to the National Register in 1993.

See also

National Register of Historic Places listings in Wharton County, Texas

References

Methodist churches in Texas
Churches on the National Register of Historic Places in Texas
Neoclassical architecture in Texas
Churches completed in 1927
20th-century Methodist church buildings in the United States
Buildings and structures in Wharton County, Texas
National Register of Historic Places in Wharton County, Texas
Neoclassical church buildings in the United States